Pia Nielsen is a retired female badminton player of Denmark.

Career
One of Europe's better all-around female players in the late 1970s and early 1980s, Nielsen played particularly well in the IBF's first three World Championships. She won a bronze medal at the 1977 World Championships in women's doubles with Inge Borgström, a bronze medal in mixed doubles at the 1980 World Championships with Steen Fladberg, and a silver medal in mixed doubles with Fladberg in the 1983 Championships. Nielsen won several international titles on the European continent in each of badminton's three events; singles, doubles, and mixed doubles. She was a women's doubles bronze medalist at the 1978 European Championships with Inge Borgstrom when beaten by Nora Perry and Anne Statt of England in semifinals with 14–17, 11–15, and a women's doubles silver medalist in the 1980 edition of that tournament with Kirsten Larsen.

References

Danish female badminton players
Living people
Year of birth missing (living people)
20th-century Danish women